Bradford City A.F.C. is an English professional association football club based in Bradford, West Yorkshire. Bradford City been a member of the Football League since its formation in 1903. The following is a list of Bradford City players who have made fewer than 50 appearances in the Football League for Bradford City.

Players with fewer than 50 league appearances

Notes

References

Sources
 
 Soccerbase
 

 
Bradford City A.F.C. players
Players with fewer than 50 league appearances
Association football player non-biographical articles